The 2022/23 FIS Snowboard Ski World Cup, organized by the International Ski Federation is the 29th World Cup in snowboarding for men and women. The season started on 22 October 2022 in Chur, Switzerland and will conclude on 26 March 2023 in Silvaplana, Switzerland. This season included six disciplines: parallel slalom, parallel giant slalom, snowboard cross, halfpipe, slopestyle and big air.

Map of world cup hosts 
All 28 locations hosting world cup events in this season.

Men

Calendar

Snowboard Cross (SBX)

Parallel (PGS/PSL)

Halfpipe (HP)

Slopestyle (SS)

Big Air (BA)

Standings

Parallel overall (PSL/PGS)

Parallel slalom

Parallel giant slalom

Snowboard Cross

Freestyle overall (BA/SS/HP)

Halfpipe

Slopestyle

Big Air

Women

Calendar

Snowboard Cross (SBX)

Parallel (PGS/PSL)

Halfpipe (HP)

Slopestyle (SS)

Big Air (BA)

Standings

Parallel overall (PSL/PGS)

Parallel slalom

Parallel giant slalom

Snowboard Cross

Freestyle overall (BA/SS/HP)

Halfpipe

Slopestyle

Big Air

Team

Parallel mixed (SXT)

Standings

Snowboard cross mixed team (SBX)

Nations Cup

Overall

Podium table by nation 
Table showing the World Cup podium places (gold–1st place, silver–2nd place, bronze–3rd place) by the countries represented by the athletes.

References 

FIS Snowboard World Cup
FIS Snowboard World Cup
FIS Snowboard World Cup
Snowboard